Swepson James Taylor (May 11, 1862 - April 25, 1947) was the mayor of Jackson, Mississippi, from 1913 to 1917.

Biography 
Taylor was born on May 11, 1862, in Alabama. He married Louise Blum Smith in 1889.

References 

1862 births
1947 deaths
Mayors of Jackson, Mississippi